Albert Llovera Massana (born 11 September 1966) is a rally driver and former alpine skier from Andorra. He became the youngest athlete to compete in the Winter Olympics in 1984 at the age of 17. A serious accident in 1985 left him paralysed from the waist down. He has since taken up rallying, using cars with specially adapted hand controls. He is currently competing in the Super 2000 World Rally Championship.

Career

At the age of 17, Llovera became the youngest ever athlete to compete in the Winter Olympics when he represented Andorra at the 1984 games in Sarajevo, Yugoslavia. In the following year, 1985, whilst competing in the European Ski Cup, also in Sarajevo, he suffered a serious accident which left him using a wheelchair with paraplegia beginning at lower back level.

He turned to motorsport, first competing on quad bikes and then starting in rallying. In 1989 he won the Peugeot Rally Cup in Andorra. In 2001, with the support of Fiat, he began competing in the Junior World Rally Championship in a Fiat Punto S1600. He continued in the championship in 2002.

After competing in Spain along with selected WRC appearances he returned full-time to the world stage in 2010 to contest the Super 2000 World Rally Championship in a Fiat Abarth Grande Punto S2000. He finished fifth in class on his first event Rally Mexico. He scored a best overall result of 17th on Rally Catalunya, which was not a round of the SWRC.

He continued in the SWRC in 2011, finishing fourth in the category in Jordan.

In 2020 he will be competing the Dakar rally in an Iveco truck from the Dutch Team de Rooy.

Complete WRC results

JWRC Results

SWRC results

Notes

References

External links

 
 
 

1966 births
Living people
Andorran male alpine skiers
Olympic alpine skiers of Andorra
Alpine skiers at the 1984 Winter Olympics
Andorran rally drivers
World Rally Championship drivers
Intercontinental Rally Challenge drivers